Football Mania (known as Soccer Mania outside Europe) is a Lego-themed sports game released in 2002 for the PlayStation 2, Microsoft Windows and Game Boy Advance. It was developed by Silicon Dreams and published by Electronic Arts and Lego Interactive, and was the first Lego game to be co-published by Electronic Arts, as well as the first to lack the "Lego" branding in the name.

The game features a simplified version of association football, with six players per side and no offsides, throw-ins, or fouls. There are many different maps for the game all with music and sounds. Teams and stadia within the game are based upon existing Lego themes. Power-ups, such as speed boosts and shields, spawn randomly on the pitch during play. The game features a number of modes, such as quick match, exhibition, a knock-out tournament, and training, which doubles as a series of minigames.

Reception

The PlayStation 2 version received "mixed" reviews according to the review aggregation website Metacritic.

See also
Lego Sports
Lego Pirates
List of Lego video games

References

External links
 

2002 video games
Association football video games
Game Boy Advance games
Lego video games
Multiplayer and single-player video games
PlayStation 2 games
Tiertex Design Studios games
Video games developed in the United Kingdom
Windows games